Olepa schleini is a moth of the family Erebidae first described by Thomas J. Witt, Günter C. Müller, Vasiliy D. Kravchenko, Michael A. Miller, Axel Hausmann and Wolfgang Speidel in 2005. It is only known from the coastal regions of Israel, but is probably an alien species, as its food plant is not native to Israel. The species was discovered in 2005 and is named for the entomologist and sculptor Yosef Schlein.
The larvae only feed on Ricinus communis, which is curious because this plants produces the natural insecticide ricin.

According to the author, the species is in fact a biblical moth species mentioned in the Book of Jonah, in which there is a description of a worm that, nightly, infested a kikayon (Ricinus) plant, and caused it to wither. The larvae of the recently described Olepa schleini are the only insects which regularly infest Ricinus communis in Israel and adjacent countries. The aggregation of larvae on particular trees, with the unusual feeding that includes the stems, causes massive damage and withering of this plant.

References 

Spilosomina
Moths described in 2005
Moths of the Middle East
Endemic fauna of Israel